Nirodbaran Chakravarty (or Chakraborty; 17 November 1903 – 17 July 2006, Pondicherry), known mononymously as Nirodbaran, or "Nirod" for short, was the closest disciple, personal physician and literary secretary  to Sri Aurobindo and scribe for Savitri: A Legend and a Symbol and senior member of the Sri Aurobindo Ashram.

Life 
He graduated from the University of Edinburgh with a degree in medicine.  He was told about Sri Aurobindo and The Mother by Dilip Kumar Roy while in Paris. In 1930, he visited the Ashram and met the Mother and was overwhelmed and had a spiritual experience. After some vacillation, he finally felt the call and joined Sri Aurobindo Ashram in 1933, leaving behind the prospect of a highly lucrative career. In the Ashram he entered upon a new life and had many experiences and realizations. He returned to the Ashram with the intention of practising Yoga, and took up work as the resident doctor.  He found to his surprise that poetry was one of the vocations taken up by some disciples. As Sri Aurobindo had already withdrawn from the public life of the ashram, he communicated with and instructed the sadhaks via letters, and Nirodbaran entered into a voluminous correspondence with Sri Aurobindo for five years, described as 'epistolary history', alone runs into 1,200 pages who encouraged and guided his attempts at poetry. He published a collection of his poems as Blossom of the Sun and 50 poems by Nirodbaran, which were revised and commented on by Sri Aurobindo.

Circumstances propelled Nirodbaran into Sri Aurobindo presence in November 1938 after he tripped and fell in his room, fracturing his right thigh. Nirodbaran was required to be in attendence as a Physician.  
Nirodbaran served Sri Aurobindo for the next 12 years, until he took Samadhi. Nirodbaran was born into an aristocratic and distinguished Zamindar family. Nirodbaran was paternal uncle of the late Major Sukumar Talukdar, war veteran.He served as the Regimental medical officer of 2/5 Gorkha Rifles(Frontier Force)in 1965 war. Nirod da's nephew is Anil Talukdar the daughter of Anil's maternal uncle Kritika Chaudhuri name is Molly was married to Nationalist leader Barrister Chittaranjan Das daughter-in-law cousin Dr. Arup Bose. Dr. Nirodbaran is also related with Nobel laureate, Rabindranath Tagore,his paternal cousin Dr. Arabinda(Barrister,England),is married to Atashi daughter of Asit kumar Haldar. Asit Haldar's Maternal grandmother is Saratkumari Devi, she is the sister of Rabindranath Tagore. Sukumari Devi is the sister of Saratkumari Devi and Rabindranath Tagore, and the paternal grandmother of former Army chief Gen Jayanto Nath Chaudhuri. Nirod Da is cousin of Saumyendranath Tagore, he is Rabindranath Tagore grand nephew. Saumyendranath Tagore married Srimati Hutheesingh. Srimati Tagore's brother Gunottam (Raja) Hutheesingh married Krishna Nehru sister of First Prime Minister Jawaharlal Nehru. Former Army chief General Jayanto Nath Chaudhuri is Nirodbaran's cousin. Nirodbaran is Maternal cousin of the first former Air Chief Marshal Subroto Mukherjee, he is the grand nephew of Chittaranjan Das.       
Later he had published Talks with Sri Aurobindo (3 volumes), Correspondence with Sri Aurobindo (2 volumes), and his memoir 12 years with Sri Aurobindo, as well as various volumes of poetry and other writings.

Nirodbaran left his body on the evening of 17 July 2006 at the Ashram Nursing home in Pondicherry. He went peacefully. He was 102. His Samadhi is at the Ashram's Cazanove Gardens. 

 Twelve years with Sri Aurobindo Chapter 1 - Nirodbaran
 Name Index  
 Supporting spiritual search

1903 births
2006 deaths
Sri Aurobindo
Alumni of the University of Edinburgh
20th-century translators